Bruno Peter Gaido (21 Mar 1916  – 15 June 1942) was an American aviation machinist mate first class during World War II. While flying as a gunner on a SBD Dauntless during the Battle of Midway, he was shot down and captured by Imperial Japanese Navy. Gaido, along with pilot Frank O'Flaherty, was tortured and then thrown overboard to drown by the Japanese.

Early life

Bruno Gaido was born Mar 21, 1916, in Staunton, Illinois, the son of John Peter and Clementina Compagnio Gaido, who had immigrated to the United States in 1914 from Italy. His six siblings were Gidorena Irene Chiappa, Mary, Pete, Flora, Florence B., and Dominic Peter Gaido.

Naval career

Gaido enlisted in the Navy on October 11, 1940, as an apprentice seaman. He joined air squadron VS-6, which flew SBD Dauntless dive bombers. After what was originally supposed to be a temporary assignment, he joined VS-6 permanently as an aviation machinist. VS-6 was attached to the aircraft carrier USS Enterprise.

On 1 February 1942, following a bombing raid on the Marshall Islands, the Enterprise came under attack by five twin-engine Japanese bombers. The lead aircraft, led by Lieutenant Kazuo Nakai, badly damaged by anti-aircraft fire, turned back towards the Enterprise, attempting to ram it. Seeing this, Gaido abandoned his watch post and jumped in a nearby Dauntless parked on the flight deck, and returned fire using the rear-facing 30 caliber machine gun. His fire disabled the aircraft, causing it to narrowly miss the Enterprise, only hitting parked aircraft (including the one Gaido was in) before spiraling into the sea. Upon seeing this act,  Vice Admiral William Halsey spot-promoted him to aviation machinist mate first class.

Gaido was a SBD Dauntless gunner in the Battle of Midway. During the battle, he was captured by the Imperial Japanese Navy after his plane was shot down. The Japanese claimed that, under torture, he revealed details about Midway Island's defenses; however, as a carrier machinist he would have had no knowledge of details about the island.

Death

On 15 June 1942, Gaido and his pilot Frank O'Flaherty were weighted and thrown overboard Japanese destroyer Makigumo by the Japanese to drown. In April 1943, he was posthumously awarded the Distinguished Flying Cross for his actions aboard the Enterprise.

In popular culture

Gaido was portrayed by Nick Jonas in the 2019 film Midway.

Awards

References

1916 births
1942 deaths
Recipients of the Distinguished Flying Cross (United States)
United States Navy personnel killed in World War II
Battle of Midway
Japanese war crimes
People executed by Japan
American prisoners of war in World War II
World War II prisoners of war held by Japan
People from Staunton, Illinois
Military personnel from Illinois
American people of Italian descent